Gazuiyeh (also Romanized as Gazū’īyeh; also known as Garū’īyeh (Persian: گروييه), Gaz Āb, and Gazābeh) is a village in Kuh Panj Rural District, in the Central District of Bardsir County, Kerman Province, Iran. At the 2006 census, its population was 108, in 27 families.

References 

Populated places in Bardsir County